Campanula seraglio, known as the Serail bellflower, is a species of flowering plant in the family Campanulaceae. It is native to northeastern Turkey.

Distribution
This species is found on rocky mountainous crevices at elevations of 1,600m.

Status
It is listed as critically endangered by the IUCN. Human disturbance from eco-tourism poses a threat to the species. This species is situated in a national park.

References

seraglio
Flora of Turkey